Alfred Grislawski (2 November 191919 September 2003) was a German Luftwaffe military aviator during World War II, a fighter ace credited with 133 victories claimed in over 800 combat missions. The majority of his victories were claimed over the Eastern Front, with 24 claims over the Western Front. Of his 24 victories over the Western Allies, 18 were four-engined bombers.

Born in Wanne-Eickel, Grislawski grew up in the Weimar Republic and Nazi Germany. Following his his compulsory Reich Labour Service, he joined the military service of the Luftwaffe in 1937. He completed flight and fighter pilot training in 1940 and was posted to Jagdgeschwader 52 (JG 52—52nd Fighter Wing). Flying with this wing, Grislawski on 1 September 1941 druring Operation Barbarossa, the German invasion of the Soviet Union. In July 1942, he was awarded the Knight's Cross of the Iron Cross and claimed his 100th aerial victory in April 1943. In June 1943, Grislawski was wounded by a blast from a land mine. Following his convalesence, he was posted to the Western Front where he was made Staffelkapitän (squadron leader) of the newly formed 1. Staffel (1st squadron) of Jagdgruppe Süd (JGr Süd—Fighter Group South) in August 1943. In November 1943, he was transferred and appointed Staffelkapitän of 1. Staffel of Jagdgeschwader 1 "Udet" (JG 1—1st Fighter Wing). Here, he was awarded the Knight's Cross of the Iron Cross with Oak Leaves in April 1944. Grislawski flew his last combat mission on 26 September 1944 when he was shot down and wounded, spending the rest of the war in hospitals and convalesence. After the war, Grislawski worked as a truck driver and later as a janitor. He died on 19 September 2003 in Herne.

Early life and career
Grislawski was born 2 November 1919 at Wanne-Eickel in the Ruhrgebiet, the son of Gustav Grislawski, a coal miner and member of the Communist Party of Germany (KPD), and his wife Henriette. He was the second of four children, with an older brother, Walter, a younger sister, Herta, and the youngest brother Horst. His first years of his life were characterized by hardship and starvation caused by the hyperinflation in the Weimar Republic in aftermaths of World War I. On leaving school in July 1934, Grislawski left his family home and worked on a farm in Pomerania. He applied to join the Kriegsmarine (navy) but was rejected and offered to join the infantry of the Army which he declined. Grislawski was then given the option of a career in naval aviation which he accepted.

From April to late October, Grislawki completed his compulsory Reich Labour Service. On 1 November 1937, he joined the military service of the Luftwaffe with 2. Kompanie (2nd compnany) of Fliegerersatzabteilung 16 (16th Flier Replacement Unit) at Schleswig. In August 1939, he began his flight training at the flight training school in Delmenhorst. He then received further training as a fighter pilot at the Jagdfliegerschule, the fighter pilot school at Stolp-Reitz. At Stolp-Reitz, he befriended Helmut Bennemann, also from Wanne-Eickel, and Heinrich Füllgrabe. On 25 April 1940, Grislawski made his maiden flight on the Messerschmitt Bf 109. Following 51 flights on the Bf 109, he received Pilot's Badge in early June. He was then posted to 2. Staffel (2nd squadron) of Ergänzungs-Jagdgruppe Merseburg, a supplementary training unit based at Merseburg. While based at Merseburg, he met his future wife Ilse Hartmeyer in the nearby town Leuna and befriended Hermann Graf. In July 1940, Grislawski was posted to III. Gruppe (3rd group) of Jagdgeschwader 52 (JG 52—52nd Fighter Wing), a squadron of III. Gruppe.

World War II
World War II in Europe had begun on Friday 1 September 1939 when German forces invaded Poland. At the time of Grislawski's posting to III. Gruppe of JG 52, the unit had just moved to Zerbst following a brief deployment to English Channel. The Gruppe was initially commanded by Hauptmann Alexander von Winterfeldt before command passed to Major Gotthard Handrick in October. The rise of General Ion Antonescu in Romania in 1940 led to a reorganization of his country's armed forces. In this, he was supported by a military mission from Germany, the Luftwaffenmission Rumänien (Luftwaffe Mission Romania) under the command of Generalleutnant (equivalent to major general) Wilhelm Speidel. On 1 October 1940, Grislawski was promoted to Unteroffizier (non-commissioned officer) and assigned to 9. Staffel. At the time, 9. Staffel was commanded by Oberleutnant Franz Hörnig. III. Gruppe of JG 52 was transferred to Bucharest in mid-October and temporarily renamed I. Gruppe of Jagdgeschwader 28 (JG 28—28th Fighter Wing) until 4 January 1941. Its primary task was to train Romanian Air Force personnel. Grislawski arrived at Pipera Airfield on 15 October where 9. Staffel stayed until 27 May 1941.

War against the Soviet Union
Following its brief deployment in the Balkan Campaign, III. Gruppe was back in Bucharest by mid-June. There, the unit was again subordinated to the Luftwaffenmission Rumänien and reequipped with the new, more powerful Bf 109 F-4 model. On 21 June, the Gruppe was ordered to Mizil in preparation of Operation Barbarossa, the German invasion of the Soviet Union. Its primary objective was to provide fighter protection for the oil fields and refineries at Ploiești.

On 1 August, III. Gruppe flew to Iași and then to Bila Tserkva in the Ukraine and also used an airfield at Yampil from 6 to 8 August. There, Grislawski claimed his first aerial victory on 1 September, when he shot down a Soviet Polikarpov I-16 fighter near Kremenchuk. For this, he was awarded the Iron Cross 2nd Class on 9 September. On 24 September, III. Gruppe moved to the Poltava Air Base, supporting the 17th Army in the First Battle of Kharkov. There, Grislawski claimed an I-16 fighter shot down north of Kharkov on 3 October, an I-26 fighter aircraft, later referred to as Yakovlev Yak-1 fighter, northeast of Krasnohrad on 5 October, a Vultee V-11 ground attack aircraft, probably referring to the Ilyushin Il-2, near Kharkov the next day, and an I-16 fighter and an Il-2 ground attack aircraft on 14 October. On 23 October, Grislawski made an emergency landing in his Bf 109 F-4 (Werknummer 7038—factory number) near the Poltava Air Base. The same day, III. Gruppe relocated to Chaplynka in the Crimea. On 29 October, Grislawski awarded the Iron Cross 1st Class. Flying from Chaplynka, he claimed two further aerial victories on 30 October, the Polikarpov I-153 fighter shot down near Simferopol was confirmed while the Polikarpov R-Z aircraft was not confirmed.

The Gruppe then moved to an airfield at Taganrog on 2 November where they stayed until 1 January 1942. In November the Red Army regrouped and conducted a well-orchestrated recapture of Rostov. Here, Grislawski received the Front Flying Clasp of the Luftwaffe for Fighter Pilots in Gold on 5 December. The following day, he claimed two I-16 fighters shot down followed by another I-16 fighter and a R-Z reconnaissance bomber two days later. On 1 January 1942, III. Gruppe relocated to Kharkov where they remained until 29 April. Three days later, Grislawski was promoted to Feldwebel (technical sergeant) and in mid-January, he was given home leave. He returned to his unit in late February which was still based at Kharkov. On 8 March, Grislawski claimed his next aerial victory on his sixteenth combat mission following his return from home leave. That day, he was credited with the destruction of a Yak-1 fighter.

On 29 April, III. Gruppe had relocated to Zürichtal, a small village at the Inhul in the former German settlement west of Feodosia in the Crimea. On 1 May, the Gruppe was subordinated to VIII. Fliegerkorps and was supporting the 11th Army in the Battle of the Kerch Peninsula. Grislawski recorded his 20th claim on 30 April, when he shot down a Soviet I-15bis fighter-bomber.

On 12 May, German forces launched Operation Fredericus, also referred to as the Second Battle of Kharkov, with the objective to eliminate the Izium bridgehead over Seversky Donets. That day, III. Gruppe was moved to the Kharkov-Rogan airfield, southeast of Kharkov, and subordinated to the Stab (headquarters unit) of JG 52. Two days later, III. Gruppe predominantly flew fighter escort missions for Junkers Ju 87 dive bombers from VIII. Fliegerkorps attacking Soviet ground forces on the northern pincer, and claimed 52 aerial victories for the loss of one aircraft damaged. That day, Grislawski claimed two Mikoyan-Gurevich MiG-1 fighters shot down. On 15 May, during two separate missions to Staryi Saltiv, he claimed another MiG-1 fighter and a Sukhoi Su-2 light bomber. On 1 July, Grislawski was awarded the Knight's Cross of the Iron Cross. The presentation was made by Hauptmann Hubertus von Bonin, commander of III. Gruppe. Grislawski was one of four JG 52 pilots presented with the Knight's Cross that day. The other three pilots to receive the distinction that day were Feldwebel Karl Steffen, Oberleutnant Siegfried Simsch and Unteroffizier Karl Gratz.

Combat in the Caucasus
Following his return from home leave in late August, Grislawski was assigned to 7. Staffel of JG 52 which was then fighting in the Battle of the Caucasus. At the time, III. Gruppe was based at Gonschtakowka located north-northeast of Mozdok on the Terek in the Caucasus.

On 19 September 1942, III. Gruppe had relocated to an airfield named Soldatskaja, located approximately halfway between Mozdok and Pyatigorsk. The Gruppe stayed at this airfield until 1 January 1943. During this period, the pilots occasionally also operated from airfields at Mozdok (15, 18, 19, 21, 22 and 23 October) and from Digora (5 to 17 November 1942), supporting Army Group A in the Battle of the Caucasus.

In September, he claimed 16 victories over the Terek bridgehead. On 5 November he shot down four Il-2 ground attack aircraft. He was then shot down in his Bf 109 G-2 (Werknummer 14 216) by anti-aircraft artillery resulting in a forced landing at Digora.

On 15 January 1943, 7. Staffel moved to Krasnodar Airfield. Three days later, Grislawski's Rotte was intercepted by Soviet I-16 fighters and  Grislawski's Bf 109 was hit, setting on fire. He nursed his aircraft over German lines before baling out, sustaining facial burns. Grislaski was one of the four pilots in the famed Karaya Quartet.

On 26 January 1943, Grislawski was promoted to Leutnant (second lieutenant), effective as of 1 December 1942, for courage against the enemy. He recorded his 92nd victory on 3 February 1943. On 27 April 1943, he recorded his 100th victory. He was the 36th Luftwaffe pilot to achieve the century mark.

On 4 June 1943, Grislawski was wounded by a blast from a German land mine near Taman. He, and fellow pilots Edmund Rossmann and Oskar Rydwal, were on the way to the beach for a swim in the Taman Bay when Rydwal had stepped on a mine. Both Rydwal and Grislwaski were seriously injured by the blast. Rossmann managed to take both of them back to airfield where they were immediately flown out to a hospital at Simferopol. There, Grislawski underwent surgery for the removal of 56 fragments from his body.

On the Western Front

Following a period of convalescence at the Wehrmacht hospital in Zaporozhye, present-day Zaporizhzhia, Grislawski was posted to the Western Front. He had received orders from Major Hermann Graf to report to the Wiesbaden-Erbenheim Airfield. Graf had been tasked with the creation of Jagdgruppe Süd (JGr Süd—Fighter Group South) in June 1943. The units primary objective was to intercept the high-flying Royal Air Force de Havilland Mosquito fighter-bomber and photo-reconnaissance aircraft. In August, the orders were augmented and JGr Süd was also tasked with combating the United States Army Air Forces (USAAF) heavy bombers in Defense of the Reich. Grislawski, who had arrived at Wiesbaden-Erbenheim Airfield on 5 August, was appointed Staffelkapitän (squadron leader) of the newly formed 1. Staffel of JGr Süd.

Grislawski claimed his first two aerial victories on the Western Front on 17 August 1943. That day, the USAAF Eighth Air Force aimed at crippling the German aircraft industry in what would become the Schweinfurt–Regensburg mission. JGr Süd intercepted the USAAF bombers at 11:45 near Mannheim. For 40 minutes, the unit attacked the bombers and for the loss of two pilots killed in action claimed five aerial victories including two Boeing B-17 Flying Fortress bombers shot down by Grislawski. On 15 August, the Luftwaffe had ordered the redesignation of JGr Süd and ordered the expansion of the unit. In consequence, the unit was renamed to Jagdgeschwader 50 (JG 50—50th Fighter Wing) on 1 September, with Grislowski then commanding 1. Staffel of JG 50. On 6 September, the Eighth Air Force attacked the industrial areas of Stuttgart. The Stab and 1. Staffel intercepted the bombers northeast Stuttgart at 10:30. During the course of the battle, Grislawski claimed a B-17 bomber shot down. On 1 October, Grislawski was promoted to the rank of Hauptmann (captain). He claimed his last aerial victory with JG 50 on 14 October during the second Schweinfurt raid. JG 50 intercepted the bombers at 14:20 north of Hanau. During this encounter, Grislawski shot down a B-17 bomber south of Schweinfurt. This was JG 50's last operational mission. During a staff meeting held by the General der Jagdflieger held on 22 October it was decided that the JG 50 would be redisignated to I. Gruppe of Jagdgeschwader 301 (JG 301—301st Fighter Wing).

In defense of the Reich
On 6 November 1943, Grislawski was transferred and appointed Staffelkapitän of 1. Staffel of Jagdgeschwader 1 "Udet" (JG 1—1st Fighter Wing) based at Deelen Air Base. He replaced Oberleutnant Rudolf Engleder who was transferred. The Staffel was subordinated to I. Gruppe of JG 1 which was commanded by Hauptmann Emil Schnoor. Grislawski claimed his first aerial victory with JG 1 on 29 November. That day 360 B-17 bombers of the 1st and 3rd Bombardment Division, escorted by 352 fighter aircraft, attacked Bremen. Luftwaffe fighters were scrambled at 13:40. I. Gruppe intercepted the bombers west of Bremen. For the loss of four of their own, including two pilots killed, the Gruppe shot down two B-17 bombers, including one claimed by Grislawski. On 1 December, he was credited with the destruction of two B-17 bombers. That day, the USAAF bombers headed to Solingen.

He claimed one victory and was then shot down by USAAF bombers over Baske on 24 January 1944 and wounded, bailing out of his Focke-Wulf Fw 190 A-7 "White 1" (Werknummer 430 167). Following his convalescence, he was posted as Staffelkapitän to 8. Staffel of JG 1 on 13 March 1944, thus succeeding Oberleutnant Heinrich Overhagen who had been killed in a flying accident.  Operating the new Bf 109 G-6/AS especially equipped for high-altitude operations, the unit was tasked with combating the potent USAAF fighter escorts. On 9 April, he shot down two B-17 bombers of the 45th Combat Bombardment Wing near Schleswig.

Grislawski was awarded the Knight's Cross of the Iron Cross with Oak Leaves on 11 April, the 446th soldier to receive this distinction. The presentation was made by Adolf Hitler at the Berghof, Hitler's residence in the Obersalzberg of the Bavarian Alps, on 5 May 1944. Grislawski then led 8./JG 1 to France to combat the Allied landings in Normandy. After less than a week the unit was relocated to Germany having been decimated in operations against the beachhead.

On 7 June, Grislawski was temporarily appointed Gruppenkommandeur (group commander) of III. Gruppe of JG 1. He replaced Hauptmann Karl-Heinz Weber who had been killed in action that day. Command of the Gruppe was then officially passed on to Hauptmann Erich Woitke. On 27 July, Grislawski was shot down by Spitfires, baling out safely. At the end of July 1944 Grislawski was transferred to Staffelkapitän of 11./Jagdgeschwader 53 (JG 53—53rd Fighter Wing). He claimed two B-17 four-engine bombers shot down on 12 September. On 26 September 1944, Grislawski was credited with a P-38 twin-engine fighter shot down as his 133rd and last claim. His Bf 109 G-14 was hit in the engine by a P-51 flown by Col. Hubert Zemke and caught fire.
Grislawski bailed out, fearing that he would be shot in his parachute, he deployed his parachute at low altitude and hit the ground very hard. He was taken to a hospital at Haltern where he was diagnosed, indicating that his second and third vertebrae were cracked. Two days later, he was moved to a hospital at Gelsenkirchen-Buer, and then for further treatment to Gotha. While Grislawski was in Gotha, his wife Ilse gave birth to their daughter Ingrid, born on 24 October 1944. In early-1945, Grislawski was taken to Badgastein in the Austrian Alps for convalescence. Following the German surrender in May 1945, he was taken in US custody and taken to a POW camp in Salzburg where he was interrogated and released later that month.

Later life
After his release, Grislawski travelled to Leuna, which at the time was still occupied by the First United States Army, to rejoin his wife and child. When it became apparent that Leuna would fall under Soviet jurisdiction as part of the Soviet occupation zone, Grislawski fearing further prosecution decided to travel to his hometown of Wanne-Eickel which was then part of the British occupation zone. There, the family was reunited again in 1946.
He declined to join the Bundesluftwaffe because of his wartime injuries. Grislawski died on 19 September 2003 in Herne.

Summary of career

Aerial victory claims

According to US historian David T. Zabecki, Grislawski was credited with 132 aerial victories. Spick lists him with 133 aerial victories. Obermaier also lists Grislawski with 133 aerial victories claimed in 795 combat missions, including 175 close air support missions. He claimed 109 victories over the Eastern Front. Of his 24 victories claimed over the Western Front, eighteen were four-engined bombers. Mathews and Foreman, authors of Luftwaffe Aces — Biographies and Victory Claims, researched the German Federal Archives and found records for 127 aerial victory claims, plus one further unconfirmed claim. This figure includes 108 aerial victories on the Eastern Front and 19 on the Western Front, including 14 four-engined bombers

Awards
Iron Cross (1939)
2nd Class (9 September 1941)
1st Class (29 October 1941)
Honorary Cup of the Luftwaffe on 1 July 1942 as Feldwebel and pilot
Front Flying Clasp of the Luftwaffe for Fighter Pilots
 in Gold (5 December 1941)
 in Gold with Pennant (15 May 1943)
Knight's Cross of the Iron Cross with Oak Leaves
 Knight's Cross on 1 July 1942 as Feldwebel and pilot in the 9./Jagdgeschwader 52
 446th Oak Leaves on 11 April 1944 as Hauptmann (war officer) and Staffelkapitän of 1./Jagdgeschwader 1

Dates of rank

Notes

References

Citations

Bibliography

 
 
 
 
 
 
 
 
 
 
 
 
 
 
 
 
 
 
 
 
 
 
 
 
 
 
 
 
 
 
 
 
 
 
 

1919 births
2003 deaths
German World War II flying aces
Luftwaffe pilots
Janitors
Recipients of the Knight's Cross of the Iron Cross with Oak Leaves
German prisoners of war in World War II held by the United States
Military personnel from North Rhine-Westphalia
People from Herne, North Rhine-Westphalia